The , officially the 2022 All Japan Adults Football Tournament, and most known as the 2022 Shakaijin Cup,  was the first edition of the annually contested single-elimination tournament (or cup) since 2019. Both the 2020 and 2021 edition of the tournament was deemed cancelled due to the COVID-19 pandemic. The defending champions Tiamo Hirakata did not participate on this tournament. As it's restricted to non-league clubs (Participating on Regional or Prefectural Leagues; not included in the nation-wide league competitions), they can't enter the competition as Tiamo played the 2022 season in the Japan Football League, Japan's 4th-tier league. All the matches were streamed in the "Shakaijin Cup" channel.

Venues
The league was organized by Japan Football Association, in collaboration with the All-Japan Football Federation and the city of Shibushi. The collaboration with the Kagoshima's city of Shibushi happened due to the 2023 National Sports Conference, as this 2022 All Japan Senior Footbal Championship will be a rehearsal-like tournament for the National Sports Conference, which will be also held at Shibushi. The stadiums hosting the tournament will be all centered on the Shibushi Sports Park, and on the Shiokaze Park.

Holding method
Every match at the tournament were played under the unusual method of 40 minutes per half, instead of the usual 45, with every match being played under 80 minutes of action in total, excluding added times. The match would go directly to a penalty shoot-out, if the winner could not be decided after the full-time whistle. Up to five substitutions in three or less substitution breaks (excluding half-time) were allowed at the tournament, as per FIFA recommendation. Both methods are applied for the tournament due to the tiny 1-day interval between the matches, which could be even more tiring to the players in question if the matches had extra-time. 

The top 3 teams would qualify to play on the 2022 edition of the Japanese Regional Champions League, which serves as Japan Football League's play-off tournament. Since eight of the nine 2022 regional champions were already participating (Tōkai champions FC Kariya did not qualify), the top 3 teams did not necessarily mean the semi-finalists.

Participating teams
Regional champions who were at the time already qualified for the Regional Champions League is denoted in bold.

Schedule
The tournament schedule was officially released on 29 August 2022.  The kick-off times are displayed in accordance with the Japan Standard Time (UTC+09:00).

Round of 32

Round of 16

Quarter-finals

Semi-finals
As BTOP Thank Kuriyama is already qualified to the 2022 Regional Champions League as Hokkaido champions, the other three semi-finalists have qualified for the Champions League.

Third-place match

Final

References

External links
About the tournament
Schedule/Result

See also
2022 J1 League
2022 J2 League
2022 J3 League
2022 Japanese Regional Leagues
2022 Emperor's Cup
2022 J.League Cup
2022-23 WE League

2022 in Japanese football